Amnestus basidentatus is a species of burrowing bug in the family Cydnidae. It is found in the Caribbean Sea and North America.

References

Cydnidae
Articles created by Qbugbot
Insects described in 1960